Trilogy of Dispelling Darkness (mun sel skor gsum) - are three commentaries on the Guhyagarbha tantra by Longchenpa. They are named:

Dispelling Darkness in the Ten Directions (gsang snying 'grel pa phyogs bcu mun sel)
Dispelling Darkness of the Mind (gsang snying spyi don yid kyi mun sel)
Dispelling Darkness of Ignorance (gsang snying bsdus don ma rig mun sel)

Nyingma texts